Sullivan Community Unit School District 300 is a school district based in Sullivan, Illinois, the county seat of Moultrie County, Illinois. It is administrated by a Board of Education and Superintendent. The current Superintendent of Sullivan Community Unit School District 300 is Ted Walk who started in August 2017.

History
In the 2018–19 academic school year Sullivan School District moved the 5th Grade to the Middle School building, because of the growing enrollment in the Elementary School. By doing so, this makes the Elementary School K-4 and Middle School 5–8.

Athletics
Sullivan’s Middle School athletics participate in the Junior High Okaw Valley Conference and are members of the Illinois Elementary School Association. Sullivan’s High School athletics participate in the Central Illinois Conference and are members of the Illinois High School Association.

Boys
Baseball
Basketball
Cross Country
Football
Golf
Swimming & Diving
Track & Field

Girls
Basketball
Cheerleading
Cross Country
Golf
Softball
Swimming & Diving
Track & Field
Volleyball

Extracurricular actives
Band
Bass Fishing
Color Guard
FCA
FCCLA
FFA
Mirror Images
NEHS
NHS
Scholastic Bowl
Singers/Singers Jr./Chorus
Spanish Club
Student Council

See also
List of school districts in Illinois

References

http://www.sullivan.k12.il.us/o/district

External links
 

School districts in Illinois
Education in Moultrie County, Illinois